Steven Fortès (born 17 April 1992) is a professional footballer who plays as a centre-back for Lens. Born in France, he represents Cape Verde at international level.

Club career
Born in Marseille, Fortès played club football in France for SCO La Cayolle, Arles-Avignon B, Arles-Avignon and Le Havre.

During the 2016–17 season he made 27 appearances for Le Havre, 25 in Ligue 2 and 2 in the Coupe de la Ligue.

In June 2017, Fortès joined Toulouse on a free transfer signing a four-year contract.

He was loaned to Lens in January 2019 until the end of the season.
On 21 June 2019, the deal was made permanent with Fortes agreeing to a three-year contract. In August 2021 he moved on loan to Oostende. In summer 2022, after his return from loan, Fortès was linked with a move away from Lens.

International career
Fortès made his senior international debut for Cape Verde in 2015. He was named in the squad for the 2021 Africa Cup of Nations.

References

External links
 

1992 births
Living people
French sportspeople of Cape Verdean descent
French footballers
Association football central defenders
Cape Verdean footballers
Cape Verde international footballers
2021 Africa Cup of Nations players
Ligue 1 players
Ligue 2 players
Belgian Pro League players
AC Arlésien players
Le Havre AC players
Toulouse FC players
RC Lens players
K.V. Oostende players
Cape Verdean expatriate footballers
Cape Verdean expatriate sportspeople in Belgium
Expatriate footballers in Belgium